The black panther, also known as the Carantanian panther after the Medieval principality of Carantania, is a Carinthian historical symbol, which represents a stylized heraldic panther. As a heraldic symbol, it appeared on the coat of arms of the Carinthian Duke Herman II as well as of the Styrian Margrave Ottokar III. In this region it was most frequently imaged on various monuments and tombstones. The symbol can still be found in the coat of arms of the Austrian state of Styria, although the colours have changed. The symbol is also widely used within structures of the Slovenian security forces; namely by the Slovenian Armed Forces and the Slovenian Police. Since 1991, there have been several proposals to replace the Slovenian coat of arms with the black panther.

Origin
The origins of the symbol are unclear. According to the archaeologist and historian Andrej Pleterski, it appears for the first time in the coat of arms of the Sponheim family from Carinthia. The historian Peter Štih has denied any historically attested relation to symbols of Carantania. On the contrary, the economist Jožko Šavli, an adherent of the autochthonist Venetic theory, believed that it originated from the Roman province of Noricum, was later adopted by Carantania, and then by the Styrian nobility.

Later disputed usage

Symbol of Carantania
The symbol of the black panther in its current version was first reconstructed by the historian Jožko Šavli in the 1980s. Šavli claimed that he had discovered several feudal families originating from the old Carantanian area that had a black panther in their dynastic coat of arms. He also claimed that he had discovered several documents mentioning the black panther as an ancient symbol of Carantania. From all these evidences he reconstructed the probable appearance of the symbol of Carolingian Carantania.

Šavli's reconstruction soon gained some popularity among younger generations of Slovenian patriots and nationalists.

Symbol of Carinthia
Several academic historians, such as Peter Štih, have disputed the hypothesis that the black panther was the symbol of Carolingian and Ottonian Duchy of Carinthia. According to their views, all mentions which would suggest such a conclusion are vague. Furthermore, there is no direct evidence of the symbol dating to the time of the Slavic principality of Carantania.

Current usage

Slovenia
Jožko Šavli's stylized version of the black panther is widely used within structures of the Slovenian security forces; namely by the Slovenian Armed Forces and the Slovenian Police. Within the Slovenian military the symbol is present on a Coat of Arms of the General Staff of the Slovenian Armed Forces and the United Operational Center, although in the latter case the symbol is reversed and is facing to the right. The black panther on a white shield is also present within the official emblem of the Medical rescue center of Carinthia. The panther is also used in the Coat of Arms of the special forces unit of the Slovenian Police, although in their case stylized in red and presented on a black shield. This unit is commonly referred to as the Red Panthers.

See also 
National symbols of Slovenia
Prince's Stone
Duke's Chair

References

Further reading 
Andrej Pleterski, "Karantanski Rašamon ali mit pred mitom" in Delo, y. 39, n. 118 (May 24, 1997).
Peter Štih, "Brskanje po zgodovini in iskanje slovenskih simbolov" in Delo, y. 30, n. 130 (June 6, 1990).
Jožko Šavli, Slovenski simboli (Bilje: Založba Humar, 1995).

Heraldic beasts
Medieval Slovenia
Slovenian nationalism